Kim Chae-yeon (born September 12, 1977) is a South Korean actress. Kim was cast in the lead role in RNA (2000), Reservation for Love (2002) and Hello! Balbari (2003).

Filmography

Film

Television series

Music video

References

External links 
 
 
 

1977 births
Living people
South Korean television actresses
South Korean film actresses